Renato Ardovino (29 November 1968) is an Italian television presenter and cake designer.

Biography
Ardovino was born in Capaccio.  He collaborates with numerous cooking magazines.

Television
 from 2012 - Torte in corso con Renato, Real Time
 from 2014 - My Cake Design, Real Time
 from 2020 - Il Dolce Mondo di Renato, Food Network

Books
Torte in corso con Renato, Milano, Rizzoli Editore, 2013. 
  Il Cake Design, Malvarosa Editore, 2016

See also
Real Time (Italy)

References

External links
Real time

Living people
1968 births
Italian television presenters